Lost Love is a 2003 Italian film also known as Perduto Amor.

Lost Love or Lost Loves may refer to:

Books
Lost Love, a 1984 romantic novel by Carole Mortimer
Lost love, a 1970 Marathi-language novel by Gauri Deshpande

Film and TV
Lost Love, or Izhandha Kadhal, a 1941 Tamil film
Lost Loves (film), a 2010 Cambodian film
"Lost Love", a 1975 episode of The Six Million Dollar Man
"Lost Love", a two-part 1987 episode of MacGyver

Music

Albums
 Lost Loves (album) by Minus the Bear 2014

Songs
"Lost Love", a 1951 song by Percy Mayfield
"Lost Love", a 1958 song by Bobby Darin on the B-side of "Queen of the Hop"
"Lost Love", a 1961 song by H. B. Barnum  and covered by Ann-Margret
"Lost Love", a song by Bert Jansch from A Rare Conundrum
"Lost Love", a song by Loudon Wainwright III from I'm Alright
"Lost Love" (Molella song), a 2005 remix of Fra Lippo Lippi's "Shouldn't Have to Be Like That"
"Lost Love", a song by Meatloaf, from If You Really Want To
"Lost Love", a 1962 song by Brian Poole
"Lost Love", a 2004 song by The Dirtbombs
"Lost Love", a 1967 song by Mandala
"Lost Love", a 1964 song by The Shirelles
"Lost Love", a 1967 song by The Sonics

See also
Lost For Love, an 1874 work by Mary Elizabeth Braddon
Love Lost (disambiguation)